Bernhard Rostfeld (also Bernhard Aleksander Roostfeld or Rostfeldt or Roostfelt; 5 January 1884 – 28 January 1948 in Karaganda, Kazakhstan) was an Estonian politician.

Political offices:
 1921 Minister of Communications
 1921–1922 Minister of Agriculture and Nutrition
 1922–1923 Minister of Agriculture
 1923–1924 Minister of Commerce and Industry

References

1884 births
1948 deaths
Government ministers of Estonia
Members of the Riiginõukogu